Garyp is a village in the municipality of Tytsjerksteradiel within the province of Friesland, Netherlands. It had a population of around 1,894 in January 2017.

History 
The village was first mentioned between 1325 to 1336 as Garipe and means "village of the river bank". Garyp developed into a stretched-out village on a sandy ridge. The current Dutch Reformed church dates from 1838; however, the first church was built around 1100. Around 1930, the peat in the region was excavated.

Garyp was home to 620 people in 1840.

Gallery

References

Populated places in Friesland
Tytsjerksteradiel